Goodenia hispida is a species of flowering plant in the family Goodeniaceae and is endemic to the Northern Territory. It is a herb with egg-shaped to lance-shaped stem leaves and racemes of yellow flowers.

Description

Taxonomy and naming
Goodenia hispida was first formally described in 1810 by Robert Brown in his Prodromus Florae Novae Hollandiae et Insulae Van Diemen. The specific epithet (hispida) means "with rough or prickly hairs".

Distribution and habitat
This goodenia grows in forest in northern parts of the Northern Territory.

Conservation status
Goodenia hispida is listed as of "least concern" under the Northern Territory Government Territory Parks and Wildlife Conservation Act 1976.

References

hispida
Flora of the Northern Territory
Plants described in 1810
Taxa named by Robert Brown (botanist, born 1773)
Endemic flora of Australia